Dambořice is a municipality and village in Hodonín District in the South Moravian Region of the Czech Republic. It has about 1,500 inhabitants.

Geography
It lies in a hilly landscape of the Ždánice Forest.

History
The first written mention of Dambořice is from 1141. In 1531, the village was acquired by Jan Kuna of Kunštát. He restored the brewery, established ponds and supported viticulture, and the village prospered. As a result, in 1534, Dambořice
was promoted by Ferdinand I to a market town. In 1550, Anabaptists settled in the village. The economic prosperity was supported by the establishment of a Jewish community at the end of the 16th century, which lasted until the 20th century. After the World War II, Dambořice lost the market town title.

Economy
Dambořice is known for the Dambořice oil field. It produces about 55% of the country's oil production.

Sights
The most important landmarks are Church of Saint Martin and the Jewish cemetery. The church was first mentioned in 1326, and it was reconstructed to its current form around 1780.

References

External links

Villages in Hodonín District
Moravian Slovakia